"Poison" is the first single from American hip hop duo Kool G Rap & DJ Polo's 1989 debut album Road to the Riches. It would later feature on the compilation albums Killer Kuts (1994), The Best of Cold Chillin' (2000), Greatest Hits (2002) and Street Stories: The Best of Kool G Rap & DJ Polo (2013).

Background
The song was initially set to feature a heavy sample of King Curtis' "Memphis Soul Stew" but it was later changed and was released as a single.

Samples
"It's a Demo" samples the following songs:
"Get Up, Get into It, Get Involved" by James Brown
"Just Rhymin' with Biz" by Big Daddy Kane featuring Biz Markie

And was later sampled on:
"Poison" by Bell Biv Devoe
"Poison" by The Prodigy
"Best Foot Forward" by DJ Shadow
"Boom!" by The Roots featuring Dice Raw
"Poison" by Common Market

Track listing
A-side
 "Poison" (Hip Hop Version) (5:26)
 "Poison" (Dub Version) (5:43)

B-side
 "Poison" (Radio Version) (2:30)

References

External links
 "Poison" at Discogs

1988 singles
Kool G Rap songs
Songs written by Marley Marl
Songs written by Kool G Rap
1988 songs
Song recordings produced by Marley Marl
Cold Chillin' Records singles